Dagzê District is a district of Lhasa immediately east of the district of Chengguan, Tibet. The Lhasa River runs through the district. As of 2013 the total population was 29,152, mostly ethnic Tibetans engaged in agriculture. The district is home to the Ganden and Yerpa monasteries.

Location

Dazi means "Tiger peak" in Tibetan. It was founded in 1354. Dazi District was established in 1959.
The district lies on both sides of the middle reaches of the Lhasa River.
Zhanang County is to the south, Maizhokunggar County to the east and Linzhou County to the north.

Dazi is in a semi-arid plateau monsoon climate zone.
About 80%–90% of precipitation falls in the summer.

Administration
The district includes one town and five townships. 
The district seat is Dêqên Town, which had a population of 7,382 in 2003.
Subdivisions are:

 Dêqên Town
 Targyai Township
 Zangdog Township
 Tanggar Township
 Xoi Township
 Dromdoi Township

People and economy
As of 2013 the total population was 29,152.
Most of the people are ethnic Tibetan but there are some Han people and other ethnic minorities.
The main occupation is agriculture, including production of wheat, barley, rapeseed, potatoes and other vegetables.
Livestock include yaks, cattle, sheep, chickens and ducks. Pigs are also farmed, mainly indoors. 
As of 2012 per capita income of farmers and herdsmen was 6,740 yuan.
A growing amount of fruit and greenhouse-grown organic vegetables, edible mushrooms and medicinal plants is being marketed under the "Dazi Pure" label.
As a sideline people make ethnic handicrafts.

Infrastructure
In 2010 there were 28 schools in the county, including one junior high school and one kindergarten, with 276 full-time teachers.
There is a district hospital and five township hospitals.
The Sichuan-Tibet Highway (China National Highway 318) runs through the county.

The Dazi Bridge, built by the Highway Bureau of Xizang Autonomous Region in 1984, crosses the Lhasa River. 
In November 2014 it was reported that a new suspension bridge over the Lhasa River linking highway S202 to highway G318 was 80% complete, and would be opened to traffic in 2015.
The total investment was 88 million yuan.

Monasteries
The main monasteries in Dagzê are Ganden Monastery and Yerpa.
Gandain monastery was built after 1409 at the initiative of Je Tsongkhapa, founder of the Gelug sect, and is the most important of this sect. The mountain is said to have the shape of a reclining elephant.
The monastery includes Buddha halls, palace residences, Buddhist colleges and other buildings.
Dra Yerpa temple, on a hillside in Dagze County, is known for its meditation cave connected with Songtsän Gampo, the 7th century Tibetan ruler.

References

Sources

 
County-level divisions of Lhasa